Anatoly Ivanovich Akimov (15 November 1947 – 28 June 2002) was a Russian water polo player who competed for the Soviet Union in the 1972 Summer Olympics.

Akimov had one sister Tatiana and three brothers, Victor, Nikolay, and Vladimir. All brothers were national water polo players, and Vladimir also won an Olympic gold medal. After retiring from competitions, Anatoly took various odd jobs, including a driver.

See also
 Soviet Union men's Olympic water polo team records and statistics
 List of Olympic champions in men's water polo
 List of Olympic medalists in water polo (men)
 List of World Aquatics Championships medalists in water polo

References

External links
 

1947 births
2002 deaths
Soviet male water polo players
Russian male water polo players
Olympic water polo players of the Soviet Union
Water polo players at the 1972 Summer Olympics
Olympic gold medalists for the Soviet Union
Olympic medalists in water polo
Sportspeople from Moscow
Medalists at the 1972 Summer Olympics